Varanmaare Aavashyamundu is a 1983 Indian Malayalam-language film, directed by Hariharan and produced by Joy. The film stars Rajkumar, Swapna, Vincent and Sukumari in the lead roles. The film has musical score by K. J. Joy. It was commercially successful.

Plot

Cast

Rajkumar as Rajkumar
Swapna as Pappi
Vincent as Mohan
Sukumari as Kalyani
Pattom Sadan as Sadashivan Nair
V. D. Rajappan as Rajappan
Bahadoor as Dubai Keshavan
Balan K. Nair as Abdullakka
Kuthiravattam Pappu as Omanakuttan
Oduvil Unnikrishnan as Karanavar
Paravoor Bharathan
Ravi Menon as Ravikumar
Ahalya 
Lalithasree as Houseowner
Mafia Sasi as Gunda
Kundara Johnny as Gunda
Benny as Chinnan
Ragini as Kittu
 Aravindan as Aravindan

Soundtrack
The music was composed by K. J. Joy and the lyrics were written by P. Bhaskaran.

References

External links
 

1983 films
1980s Malayalam-language films
Films directed by Hariharan